Physio-Control Corporation was founded in 1955 by Dr. Karl William Edmark as a pioneering company in the field of portable defibrillation. Physio-Control manufactures emergency defibrillation and automated CPR equipment. The company was most recently acquired in 2016 by Stryker Corporation and is now part of Stryker's Emergency Care division.

History

 1955 - Founded by Karl William Edmark
 1980 - Acquired by Eli Lilly and Company
 1994 - Acquired by Bain Capital
 1998 - Acquired by Medtronic for $538 million
 2006 - Medtronic announces Physio-Control's spin-off
 2011 - Company taken private in 2011 via a $487 million acquisition by Bain Capital
 2016 – Stryker Corporation announces agreement to acquire Physio-Control International, Inc. for $1.28 Billion

Products
The company's products are primarily for the emergency treatment of sudden cardiac arrest events. The Lifepak line of defibrillators includes both advanced units for advanced cardiac life support trained personnel, and automated external defibrillators for use by first responders and the general public. Additionally, the company distributes an automated chest compression system called the LUCAS 3. While this system may be used in the field, it has also been used in the hospital setting to prolong human life while surgical or other procedures are accomplished. Physio also produces a CPR coaching device called the TrueCPR coaching device.

References

External links

Medical technology companies of the United States
Medical device manufacturers
American companies established in 1955
Health care companies established in 1955
Health care companies based in Washington (state)
Companies based in Redmond, Washington
1980 mergers and acquisitions
1994 mergers and acquisitions
1998 mergers and acquisitions
Corporate spin-offs
2011 mergers and acquisitions
2016 mergers and acquisitions
Bain Capital companies